Sakassou Department is a department of Gbêkê Region in Vallée du Bandama District, Ivory Coast. In 2021, its population was 108,110 and its seat is the settlement of Sakassou. The sub-prefectures of the department are Ayaou-Sran, Dibri-Assirikro, Sakassou, and Toumodi-Sakassou.

History
Sakassou Department was created in 1988 as a first-level subdivision via a split-off from Bouaké Department.

In 1997, regions were introduced as new first-level subdivisions of Ivory Coast; as a result, all departments were converted into second-level subdivisions. Sakassou Department was included in Vallée du Bandama Region.

In 2011, districts were introduced as new first-level subdivisions of Ivory Coast. At the same time, regions were reorganised and became second-level subdivisions and all departments were converted into third-level subdivisions. At this time, Sakassou Department became part of Gbêkê Region in Vallée du Bandama District.

Notes

Departments of Gbêkê
1988 establishments in Ivory Coast
States and territories established in 1988